St. Jean de Brébeuf Catholic Secondary School is a Catholic secondary school for the city of Hamilton. It is a part of the Hamilton-Wentworth Catholic District School Board and is located on the East Mountain of the city, serving the south-east of Hamilton as well as parts of Binbrook, Caledonia and Glanbrook.

The school's Latin motto is "anima, mens, corpus". St. Jean de Brébeuf Catholic Secondary School is often referred to as SJB or Brébeuf. It graduates approximately 350 students every year with over 75% of them going onto post-secondary education.

Athletics 
Brébeuf participates in the Golden Horseshoe with other Catholic secondary schools. The school won HWCDSB City titles for Midget Boys Basketball and Senior Boys Volleyball in 2017-18 while the Senior Boys Soccer team won GHAC to represent at OFSAA.

Brébeuf fields the following teams annually:
 Junior Boys Football
 Senior Boys Football
 Junior Boys and Girls Soccer
 Senior Boys and Girls Soccer
 Midget, Junior, and Senior Boys and Girls basketball
 Girls Rugby (Varsity)
 Boys and Girls Hockey (Varsity)
 Track and Field
 Badminton
 Junior and Senior Boys and Girls Volleyball
 Swimming (Varsity)
 Wrestling (Varsity)
 Coed Beach Volleyball (Varsity)

Student council 
Brébeuf's student council donates their profits from events to local charities at the end of the year, as well as running charity events during the school year.

Feeder schools
 St. Margaret Mary
 Our Lady of Lourdes
 St. John Paul II
 Blessed Teresa of Calcutta
 Sacred Heart
 St. Daniel
 St. Kateri Tekakwitha
 Blessed Sacrament
 St. Marguerite d'Youville

Notable alumni 

 Dave Andreychuk – former NHL Player
 Luka Gavran - Goalkeeper for Toronto FC
 Adam Mair – former NHL Hockey Player
 Blake McGrath – dancer, pop singer and choreographer (Best known for being a judge on "So you Think You Can Dance Canada")
 Brian McGrattan – NHL Hockey Player
 Spencer Moore – CFL Player – Saskatchewan Roughriders
 Zac Rinaldo – NHL Player

See also 
 List of secondary schools in Ontario

References

External links 
 
 
 
 

High schools in Hamilton, Ontario
Catholic secondary schools in Ontario
Educational institutions established in 1974
1974 establishments in Ontario